Arisa III: Look is the third studio album by Japanese recording artist Arisa Mizuki, released through Nippon Columbia on December 24, 1994. It is predominantly a pop and dance music album that features songs written and produced by an array of famous Japanese musicians, including Anri, Yasuharu Konishi (of Pizzicato Five), Keizō Nakanishi, Takao Konishi, Chika Ueda, and Tetsuya Komuro. Arisa III: Look is Mizuki's first studio album in over two years.

As with her previous studio album, Arisa II: Shake Your Body for Me, Mizuki released a Komuro production as lead single. "Happy Wake Up!" was released two months prior to the release of Arisa III: Look and became Mizuki's second most successful song, selling over 340,000 copies. "Happy Wake Up!" was the first and sole single to be released from the album. The artwork for the album was created by art director Mitsuo Shindō, who has also worked with artists such as Misia, Glay, and SMAP.

Arisa III: Look debuted at number 24 on the Oricon Weekly Albums chart with 20,720 copies in its first week, becoming Mizuki's first studio album to chart outside the top twenty.

Critical reception 
CD Journal gave Arisa III: Look a positive review, complimenting Mizuki for her "outstanding singing sense" yet expressing disappointment at "Happy Wake Up!" being the album's catchiest offering. They further commented that Yasuharu Konishi's work on "Pari no Koibito / Tōkyō no Koibito", "Friend and Lover" and "Amai Kioku" is "laughable" at how "Pizzicato [Five]" it is.

Commercial performance 
Arisa III: Look debuted on the Oricon Weekly Albums chart at number 24 with 20,720 copies sold in its first week. The album charted for seven weeks and has sold a total of 66,870 copies.

Track listing

Charts and sales

References 

1994 albums
Alisa Mizuki albums
Nippon Columbia albums
Japanese-language albums